Managing Intellectual Property (also known as Managing IP or MIP) is a monthly magazine published in English and specializes in intellectual property. Jeremy Phillips launched the magazine in 1990 and sold it to Euromoney Institutional Investor PLC in 1991. MIP is part of the Euromoney's Legal Media Group.

Managing IP launched its legal directory publication (World IP Contacts Handbook) in 1994. The legal directory was rebranded in 2013 as IP STARS, an annual guide that ranks the leading IP law firms and practitioners across the world. The guide is based on an annual research conducted by Managing IP's research analysts in Hong Kong, London and New York. Managing IP's inaugural awards ceremony (in 2006) was attended by more than 130 guests including the late Sir Hugh Laddie, who was presented with a lifetime achievement award.

See also 
 List of intellectual property law journals

References

External links 
 
 

Business magazines published in the United Kingdom
English-language magazines
Intellectual property law magazines
Monthly magazines published in the United Kingdom
Magazines established in 1990
Magazines published in London